Juklevatnet is a lake in the municipalities of Hemsedal (in Viken county) and Lærdal (in Vestland county), Norway.

The lake is regulated by a hydroelectric dam which is part of a nearby power station.  The water flows into the lake Vesle Juklevatnet, then the river Jukleåni, and then into the lake Eldrevatnet.

See also
List of lakes in Norway

References

Lakes of Viken (county)
Lakes of Vestland
Lærdal
Hemsedal
Reservoirs in Norway